Aporocidaris antarctica is a species of sea urchin of the family Ctenocidaridae. Their armour is covered with spines. It is placed in the genus Aporocidaris and lives in the sea. Aporocidaris antarctica was first scientifically described in 1909 by Ole Theodor Jensen Mortensen, Danish professor. It has a circum-Antarctic distribution.

Description
The test and secondary spines are purple and the rather brittle primary spines are white.

See also 
Apatopygus recens (Milne-Edwards, 1836)
Aphanopora echinobrissoides (de Meijere, 1903)
Aporocidaris eltaniana (Mooi, David, Fell & Choné, 2000)

References 

Ctenocidaridae
Animals described in 1909
Taxa named by Ole Theodor Jensen Mortensen